Guests Who Arrived on the Last Train is a 1967 South Korean film directed by Yu Hyun-mok. It was presented at the 6th Panama International Film Festival.

Synopsis
A literary drama about a young man dying of lung cancer and his circle of friends.

Cast
 Lee Soon-jae
 Moon Hee
 Seong Hun
 Nam Jeong-im
 Kim Seong-ok
 Ahn In-sook
 Han Chan-ju
 Jeong Min
 Kim Ung
 Seong So-min

References

External links 
 
 

1967 films
1960s Korean-language films
South Korean drama films
Rail transport films